The All Pakistan Federation of Trade Unions (APFTU) is a national trade union center in Pakistan. It was founded in 1947 and has a membership of 602,000.

The APFTU is affiliated with the International Trade Union Confederation.

References

Trade unions in Pakistan
International Trade Union Confederation
Trade unions established in 1947